Summerstock Conservatory was a theatre company based out of Westmount Charter School in Calgary, Alberta from 2002 to 2012. Every August, between the first and the fourteenth, high school and young post-secondary students from across Canada, performed a play in Olympic Plaza.

History

Summerstock Conservatory, formally MainStage, was founded in 2002 by Jim Senft, who directed Summerstock's first show Guys and Dolls. Summerstock continued performing shows annually until the group disbanded in 2012.

Directors and producers
While Jim Senft is the original director of Summer stock, he took a year long break in 2005 from the Calgary show, to branch out to Toronto to create another Summerstock Conservatory. Another running of Guys and Dolls was held in Toronto, produced and co-directed by Joan Mansfield, a professional theatre producer based in Toronto, during Calgary's production of Annie Get Your Gun. During that time, the current tech director in Calgary, Josh Collins, also took the position of artistic director. The following year, Jim Senft returned to Calgary. 

Since the beginning of the program, the head producer was Brandi Sedore, also a secretary at Westmount Charter School where Summerstock held its rehearsals. However, in 2007, Brandi officially stepped down from her position and Kathryn Waters took over for the production of Footloose. Nonetheless, Brandi returned for the 2007–2008 year, and continued until Jayson Krause took over as Executive Producer for the 2010–2011 year.

Educational aspects
Educational coursework for Summerstock is offered through Westmount Charter School, which awards Alberta high school credits in courses relating to the activities of its cast and technical crew.  Cast members can receive high school credit while performing in Summerstock.  The company also provides a scholarship program to cast members, once they have a high school diploma and have completed the other requirements.  The company also offers financial compensation to certain university members each year, who work for Summerstock during the summer, generally as lead cast members.  Further, each year contributing high schools receive grants to help run their respective drama departments, offered through The Summerstock Foundation, the charitable arm of Summerstock.

Summerstock Theatre Festival
The Summerstock Theatre Festival is an annual outdoor performance of a musical held in the Arts District in downtown Calgary, Alberta, Canada. Based on the premise of the traditional Summerstock Theatre, this program presents Broadway-style theatre outdoors at Olympic Plaza. Performers are Calgary high school and university students, who come home from all across Canada to perform Broadway musicals.

References

External links

Theatre in Calgary
Theatre companies in Alberta
Companies based in Calgary